Uncial 0242 (in the Gregory-Aland numbering), is a Greek uncial manuscript of the New Testament. Paleographically it has been assigned to the 4th century.

Description 
The codex contains a small parts of the Gospel of Matthew 8:25-9:2; 13:32-38,40-46, on two parchment leaves (23 cm by 20 cm). The text is written in two columns per page, 25 lines per page, in uncial letters.

Currently it is dated by the INTF to the 4th century.

It was examined by Ramón Roca-Puig in 1959. 
The manuscript was added to the list of the New Testament manuscripts by Kurt Aland in 1963.

Location 
Currently the codex is housed at the Egyptian Museum (no. 71942) in Cairo.

Text 
The Greek text of this codex is mixed. Aland placed it in Category III.

See also 

 List of New Testament uncials
 Textual criticism

References

Further reading 

 R. Roca-Puig, "Un pergamino griego del Evangilo de San Mateo", Emérita 27 (Madrid: 1959), pp. 59-73.

External links 

 Uncial 0242 at the Wieland Willker, "Textual Commentary"

Greek New Testament uncials
4th-century biblical manuscripts